T-Mobile Czech Republic, a.s. is a Czech wireless network operator, owned by the German telecommunications provider Deutsche Telekom. T-Mobile is the largest mobile phone network operator in the Czech Republic. As of 31 December 2014, six million customers were using T-Mobile services.

History
T-Mobile has been operating in the Czech market since 1996 as RadioMobil (joint venture of Ceske Radiokomunikace and Deutsche Telekom) providing network named Paegas. 
T-Mobile Czech Republic a.s. operates a public mobile communications network on the GSM, UMTS and LTE standard. On 19 October 2005, T-Mobile was the first operator in the Czech Republic to launch this third-generation technology. In 2011 O2 Czech Republic and T-Mobile Czech Republic signed an agreement on sharing their 2G, 3G and LTE networks.

References

Deutsche Telekom
Mobile phone companies of the Czech Republic
Telecommunications companies established in 1996
1996 establishments in the Czech Republic